Micraloa is a genus of moths in the family Erebidae from Hindustan, Himalayas, Sri Lanka and Myanmar (Burma).

Species
 Micraloa lineola (Fabricius, 1793)
 Micraloa emittens (Walker, 1855)

References
 , 2004: A new genus is established for Bombyx lineola Fabricius, 1793, with systematic notes on the genus Aloa Walker, 1855 (Lepidoptera, Arctiidae). Atalanta 35 (3/4): 403-413, colour plate XXIb, Würzburg.
Natural History Museum Lepidoptera generic names catalog

Spilosomina
Moth genera